Košarkarsko društvo Slovan, commonly referred to as KD Slovan or simply Slovan, is a basketball team from Ljubljana, Slovenia.

History

The origins of the club are dating back to 1951, when Stane Urek suggested a formation of a basketball club in Poljane (KK Poljane), at one of Ljubljana's high schools. The club got its official permission to play on 13 April in the same year. After just two days, they organised their first tournament, at which they invited Rudar Trbovlje and Krka, both playing in the first national league.

The team was also named KK Krim, KK Slavija, KK Odred, and finally KD Slovan – the name they have had until today. After having played for more than 20 years on the basketball court at Poljane Grammar School, they moved to Kodeljevo Hall in the 1974–75 season, where they have been playing ever since.

Season-by-season records

Achievements
Runners-up of the Slovenian First League in the 2004–05 and 2005–06 seasons (lost to Olimpija).

International players

Note: The flag before name indicates the national team

References

External links

Official website  

Basketball teams established in 1951
Basketball teams in Slovenia
Sports clubs in Ljubljana
1951 establishments in Slovenia
Basketball teams in Yugoslavia